Livesey is a civil parish in Blackburn with Darwen, Lancashire, England.  It contains seven buildings that are recorded in the National Heritage List for England as designated listed buildings, all of which are listed at Grade II.  This grade is the lowest of the three gradings given to listed buildings and is applied to "buildings of national importance and special interest".  Originally a rural area, the two oldest listed buildings were farmhouses.  The Leeds and Liverpool Canal was built through the parish and, associated with this, are a listed bridge and an aqueduct.  The parish, which includes the village of Feniscowles and the district of Cherry Tree, later became partly absorbed by the growing population of Blackburn.  The listed buildings not noted above are a house, later used as offices, a church, and a vicarage.

Buildings

References

Citations

Sources

Buildings and structures in Blackburn with Darwen
Lists of listed buildings in Lancashire